Ryan Anderson (born July 22, 1987) is a Canadian former professional road racing cyclist, who rode professionally between 2008 and 2020, for the , , , , and three stints with the / teams.

Born in Edmonton, Anderson spent his childhood years in Spruce Grove, Alberta. Anderson currently resides in North Vancouver, British Columbia. He was named in the startlist for the 2016 Vuelta a España.

Major results

2009
 2nd Time trial, National Under-23 Road Championships
 6th Duo Normand (with David Veilleux)
 8th Overall Coupe des nations Ville Saguenay
2010
 4th Overall Vuelta del Uruguay
 7th Grand Prix des Marbriers
2012
 5th Schaal Sels
 5th Grand Prix Pino Cerami
2013
 2nd Road race, National Road Championships
 2nd Overall Tour of Elk Grove
 3rd Tour de Delta
 8th Overall Tour of Alberta
1st  Canadian rider classification
2014
 2nd White Spot / Delta Road Race
 4th Winston-Salem Cycling Classic
 5th Overall Tour of Alberta
1st  Canadian rider classification
2015
 2nd Road race, National Road Championships
 2nd White Spot / Delta Road Race
 3rd Overall GP Internacional do Guadiana
1st  Points classification
1st Stage 2
2016
 2nd Polynormande
 5th Grand Prix La Marseillaise
2017
 7th White Spot / Delta Road Race

Grand Tour general classification results timeline

References

External links
 
 
 
 Cycling Base: Ryan Anderson
 SpiderTech-C10: Ryan Anderson
 Optum-Kelly Benefit Strategies: Ryan Anderson

1987 births
Living people
Canadian male cyclists
Cyclists from Alberta
Cyclists from British Columbia
Sportspeople from North Vancouver
Sportspeople from Edmonton
21st-century Canadian people